San Vicente, officially the Municipality of San Vicente, is a 5th class municipality in the province of Ilocos Sur, Philippines. According to the 2020 census, it has a population of 13,118 people.

Etymology
The municipality's name came from the name of Saint Vincent Ferrer, whose winged statue was found inside a box entangled in fishing nets.  The fishermen consulted this matter to the friars in Villa Fernandina (now Vigan), who identified the person depicted by the statue.  The statue was carried to the town's center, where a church was built.  From then on, the town formerly known as Tuanong (sometimes called Taonan) became San Vicente.

History
In tracing the history of San Vicente, one always has to start from Vigan. Vigan was established by the Spanish colonizer, Juan de Salcedo on June 13, 1573, up to 1582, there were only 800 residents.

Upon Salcedo's return in 1574, he brought with them the Augustinian friars in order to teach Christianity to the inhabitants. After Salcedo's death on March 11, 1576, Franciscan friars replaced the Augustinians in the year 1579. These same friars spread up to San Vicente to convert the people to the Catholic faith.

In 1591, Vigan has already an organized form of government, which included these barrios namely: Bo. Tuanong, Bo. Santa Catalina de Baba and Bo. Caoayan. There were then a population numbering about 4,000 inhabitants.

Between the years 1720 and 1737, the first chapel of Bo. Tuanong was erected. Later in 1748, the Confraternity of Jesus of Nazareth was organized. In one record of the Vigan Convent archives, a funeral that happened on January 29, 1748, at the Chapel Bo. Tuanong was recorded. Two chaplains Bro. Don Agustin de la Encarnacion and Don Pedro Geronimo de Barba were the priest stone the chapel in that year 1748. It is believed that the chapel is the first stone building that sees upon entering the San Vicente Central School from the main road. Bo. Tuanong which belonged to Vigan was the old name of San Vicente.

On June 16, 1751, the chaplain was Don Miguel de Montanez. He was the first priest there and also in the chapel of San Sebastian. It is found out that Barangay San Sebastian already erected.

Hardship in reaching Bo. Tuanong and Bo. Santa Catalina de Baba from Vigan especially during the months of June to October was experienced, due to the absence of dike or bridge. Priests from Vigan reached these places by means of a raft. The problem prompted the separation of these two barrios from Vigan in 1793.

In 1795, it was the initiation of the seat of municipality and the church and Bo. Tuanong became San Vicente de Ferrer. Don Pedro de Leon was the first parish priest and he was believed as the initiator of the construction of the Church of San Vicente.

Geography

Barangays
San Vicente is politically subdivided into 7 barangays. These barangays are headed by elected officials: Barangay Captain, Barangay Council, whose members are called Barangay Councilors. All are elected every three years.
 Bantaoay
 Bayubay Norte
 Bayubay Sur
 Lubong
 Poblacion
 Pudoc
 San Sebastian

Climate

Demographics

In the 2020 census, San Vicente had a population of 13,118.

Economy 

The municipality is known for its production of beautiful furniture made from narra and other tropical hardwoods, even from old wood previously used in wooden sugarcane crushers and old houses to make reproduction antiques.

Government
San Vicente, belonging to the first congressional district of the province of Ilocos Sur, is governed by a mayor designated as its local chief executive and by a municipal council as its legislative body in accordance with the Local Government Code. The mayor, vice mayor, and the councilors are elected directly by the people through an election which is being held every three years.

Elected officials

References

External links
Pasyalang Ilocos Sur
Philippine Standard Geographic Code
Philippine Census Information
Local Governance Performance Management System

Municipalities of Ilocos Sur